The first stage of the  in Japan took place on April 7, 2019 with the second following on 21 April 2019.

Results

Governors

Prefectural assemblies

Mayors of designated cities

Designated city assemblies

References

2019
2019 elections in Japan
April 2019 events in Japan